Rishan Ahanthem  (born 3 March 2000 ) is an Indian professional footballer who plays as a full back for I-League club  NEROCA FC.

Career
Born in Manipur, Rishan was a part of Youth Organization Sporting Club, Rising Athletic Union and Anouba Imagi Mangal. On 15 January 2021, Rishan made his professional debut for NEROCA FC against TRAU FC.He came on as 67th minute substitute for Varun Thokchom as the match ended in 1–1 draw.

Career statistics

References

2000 births
Living people
People from Manipur
Indian footballers
Footballers from Manipur
NEROCA FC players
Association football defenders
I-League players